The Ecuador national under-23 football team, also known as the Ecuador Olympic football team, represents Ecuador in international football competitions during Olympic Games and Pan American Games. The selection is limited to players under the age of 23, except for three overage players. The team is controlled by the Ecuadorian Football Federation.

Competitive record

Olympic Games

CONMEBOL Pre-Olympic Tournament

Pan American Games

Results and fixtures

2020

Current squad
Head coach:  Jorge Célico

The 23-man squad was announced on 23 December 2019.

Honours 

Pan American Games:
 Gold Medalists (1): 2007

 South American Games:
  Silver Medalists (4): 1978, 1982, 1990, 2010
  Bronze Medalists (1): 2014

 Bolivarian Games
  Gold Medalists (2): 1965, 1985
  Silver Medalists (3):  2009, 2013, 2017
  Bronze Medalists (2):  1938, 2005

References  

Ecuador national football team
South American national under-23 association football teams